Sun Fuming (born April 14, 1974 in Xifeng, Tieling, Liaoning) is a female Chinese judoka who competed in the 1996 Summer Olympics and in the 2004 Summer Olympics.

She won the gold medal in the heavyweight class in 1996. In 2000 she was unable to achieve another Olympic medal due to her injury.

References

External links
 
 
 

1974 births
Living people
Judoka at the 1996 Summer Olympics
Judoka at the 2004 Summer Olympics
Olympic bronze medalists for China
Olympic gold medalists for China
Olympic judoka of China
People from Tieling
Olympic medalists in judo
Asian Games medalists in judo
Sportspeople from Liaoning
Medalists at the 2004 Summer Olympics
Judoka at the 2002 Asian Games
Chinese female judoka
Medalists at the 1996 Summer Olympics
Asian Games gold medalists for China
Medalists at the 2002 Asian Games
Universiade medalists in judo
Manchu sportspeople
Universiade bronze medalists for China